The Papua Act 1905 (Cth) was an Act of the Parliament of Australia which transfered the territory of Papua from Britain to Australia. It formally incorporated Papua as an external territory of Australia and remained in effect until Papua's merger with New Guinea with the passage of the Papua and New Guinea Act 1949.

The Act

References

1905 in international relations
1905 in Australian law
Repealed Acts of the Parliament of Australia
Australia–Papua New Guinea relations
Papua New Guinea–United Kingdom relations
Territory of Papua
Australia–United Kingdom relations